Vaishnavi (02 February 198617 April 2006) was an Indian television actress. She has appeared in several Tamil serials and Tamil films to her credit.

Career 
Vaishnavi appeared in the Tamil serials Anni, Muhurtham, and Malargal. She acted in many TV serials and also acted as Sherin's friend in the film Whistle. She was also the video jockey for the comedy programme titled Kondattam on Sun TV which used to be broadcast every Sunday at 5PM.

Death 
Vaishnavi apparently committed suicide at the age of 20, at her residence in Chennai on 17 April 2006. On 19 April 2006, Dev Anand (serial actor) was arrested for allegedly abetting Vaishnavi's death. Vaishnavi's parents and her younger sister had been to her grandfather's house to celebrate his birthday, when she was alone at home and hanged herself. Serial actor Dev Anand accused of instigating her to commit suicide.

Filmography

Television

References

Indian film actresses
Indian television actresses
Indian child actresses
Actresses from Chennai
1986 births
2006 deaths
Suicides by hanging in India
Date of birth missing
Place of birth unknown
2006 suicides
Artists who committed suicide
Female suicides